Murder Squad is a Swedish death metal band that was formed in 1993 in Stockholm. It is a side project of two Dismember members and two Entombed members. The band is highly influenced by the American group Autopsy. On their second album Ravenous, Murderous, Chris Reifert of Autopsy appears as a guest singer. After Cederlund left Entombed, Kärki announced that there would be no more Murder Squad either. The band reunited in 2013 (without Cabeza - Jorgen Sandstrom performed in his place) for a one-off reunion gig.

Members
 Matti Kärki - vocals
 Richard Cabeza - bass
 Uffe Cederlund - guitars
 Peter Stjärnvind - drums

Discography
 Unsane, Insane and Mentally Deranged (2001)
 Ravenous, Murderous (2003)

1993 establishments in Sweden
Musical groups established in 1993
Swedish death metal musical groups
Swedish musical groups